Tales from Margaritaville is a collection of short stories by singer Jimmy Buffett, published in 1989, 230 pages long.

The book is broken up into an introduction and three sections, each containing several short stories.

An Introduction: Changes in Latitude contains "Walkabout" and "Where is Margaritaville?", the later designed to answer a question Buffett says that he is frequently asked.

The Heat Wave Chronicles contains six short stories, all based in the mythical town of Heat Wave, Alabama, on the also mythical island of Snake Bite Key.  "Take Another Road", "Off to See the Lizard", "Boomerang Love", "The Swamp Creature Let One In", "The Pascagoula Run", and "I Wish Lunch Could Last Forever" comprise the Heat Wave Chronicles.

Margaritian Madness contains "You Can't Take It With You" and "Are You Ready for Freddy?"

Son of a Son of a Sailor contains the stories "Hooked in the Heart", "Life in the Food Chain", "A Gift for the Buccaneer", and "Sometimes I Feel like a Rudderless Child".

1989 short story collections
American short story collections
Books by Jimmy Buffett